Mohammad Manjur Alam is a Bangladeshi politician and businessman. He is the former Mayor of Chittagong.
 He is the managing director of Mostafa-Hakim Group.

Career 
Alam was elected councilor of ward 10 on 30 January 1994 with the support of Bangladesh Awami League. He was re-elected twice with the support of Awami League. After ABM Mohiuddin Chowdhury was imprisoned by the Caretaker Government during the 2007-2008 Bangladeshi political crises, Alam became the acting mayor. During that time Alam's relationship with Mohiuddin deteriorated. Alam sought the nomination of Bangladesh Nationalist Party to contest the 9th parliamentary election from Chittagong-8. He did not get the nomination.

Alam was elected Mayor of Chittagong in 2010 as a candidate of Chattagram Unnayan Andolon and backed by Bangladesh Nationalist Party. He won after defeating ABM Mohiuddin Chowdhury, backed by Awami League.

In 2015, Alam lost the re-election to Awami League backed candidate AJM Nasir Uddin. Alam boycotted voting alleging irregularities. According to Bdnews24.com, there was vote rigging in some polling stations by Awami League, which was in power at national government level.

Alam runs the Bangamata Sheikh Fazilatunnesa Memorial Foundation. He has announced that he has retired from politics and will engage in social work.

References 

Bangladeshi politicians
Living people
Year of birth missing (living people)
Awami League politicians
Bangladesh Nationalist Party politicians
People from Chittagong
Mayors of Chattogram City Corporation